Ankylacantha is a genus of flies in the family Stratiomyidae.

Species
Ankylacantha keiseri Lindner, 1955

References

Stratiomyidae
Brachycera genera
Taxa named by Erwin Lindner
Diptera of Asia